Manisan is a mountain in Incheon, South Korea. It is situated in Ganghwa County and is the highest peak on Ganghwa Island. There is a popular hiking trail to the summit; at the summit is Chamseongsdan, an altar where Dangun (the founding father of Korea) performed ritual ceremonies.

See also
 List of mountains in Korea

Notes

References
 

Mountains of Incheon
Ganghwa County